Sweden competed at the 1976 Summer Olympics in Montreal, Quebec, Canada. 116 competitors, 99 men and 17 women, took part in 90 events in 16 sports.

Medalists

Gold
 Anders Gärderud — Athletics, Men's 3000 metre Steeplechase 
 Bernt Johansson — Cycling, Men's Individual Road Race 
 Hans Jacobson, Carl von Essen, Rolf Edling, Göran Flodström, and Leif Högström — Fencing, Men's Team Épée
 John Albrechtson and Ingvar Hansson — Sailing, Tempest Class

Silver
 Ulrika Knape — Diving, Women's Platform

Archery

Three of Sweden's archers from the 1972 Summer Olympics returned in 1976.  Anna-Lisa Berglund improved her score by 155 points, moving up 23 places in the rankings.  Rolf Svensson also competed again, shooting 26 points and 5 places higher than four years before.  Defending silver medallist Gunnar Jervill, however, fell to 14th place.

Women's Individual Competition:
 Anna-Lisa Berglund – 2340 points (11th place)
 Lena Sjöholm – 2322 points (13th place)

Men's Individual Competition:
 Rolf Svensson – 2412 points (11th place)
 Gunnar Jervill – 2406 points (14th place)

Athletics

Men's 800 metres
 Ake Svensson
 Heat — 1:48.86 (→ did not advance)

Men's Marathon
 Göran Bengtsson — 2:17:39 (→ 14th place)

Men's High Jump
 Rune Almen
 Qualification — 2.16m
 Final — 2.18m (→ 10th place)

Men's Discus Throw
 Rickard Bruch
 Qualification — 58.06m (→ did not advance)

Men's 20 km Race Walk
 Bengt Simonsen — 1:35:31 (→ 26th place)

Boxing

Canoeing

Cycling

Six cyclists represented Sweden in 1976.

Individual road race
 Bernt Johansson — 4:46:52 (→ Gold Medal) 
 Sven-Åke Nilsson — 4:49:01 (→ 29th place) 
 Leif Hansson — did not finish (→ no ranking)
 Alf Segersäll — did not finish (→ no ranking)

Team time trial
 Tord Filipsson
 Bernt Johansson
 Sven-Åke Nilsson
 Tommy Prim

Diving

Equestrian

Fencing

Seven fencers, six men and one woman, represented Sweden in 1976.

Men's foil
 Göran Malkar

Men's épée
 Rolf Edling
 Göran Flodström
 Hans Jacobson

Men's team épée
 Carl von Essen, Hans Jacobson, Rolf Edling, Leif Högström, Göran Flodström

Women's foil
 Kerstin Palm

Judo

Modern pentathlon

Three male pentathletes represented Sweden in 1976.

Individual
 Hans Lager
 Bengt Lager
 Gunnar Jacobson

Team
 Hans Lager
 Bengt Lager
 Gunnar Jacobson

Rowing

Sailing

Shooting

Swimming

Weightlifting

Wrestling

References

Nations at the 1976 Summer Olympics
1976 Summer Olympics
Summer Olympics